The Hugin class of destroyers consisted of  (24), previously (7), and  previously (8). These were destroyers in the Royal Swedish Navy built prior to the First World War and surviving without major incident through their lifespan. HSwMS Hugin was built by Götaverken and launched on December 10, 1910 while HSwMS Munin was constructed by Kockums and launched December 5, 1911. The ship class was built with steam turbines instead of piston engines as the previous Swedish destroyers had been. HSwMS Hugin was in service until June 13, 1947 while HSwMS Munin had been decommissioned on October 18, 1940.

Destroyer classes
 
Ships built in Gothenburg